Cephalonia-Ithaca Football Clubs Association is one of the newest Greek amateur football clubs associations, representing teams from the Greek islands of Kefalonia and Ithaca.  The association was founded in 1980, after breaking up from the Achaea Football Clubs Association.

Organization
The association is a member of the Hellenic Football Federation and organizes a regional football league and cup.

List of champions

Championships
1981  Olympiakos Argostoli
1983 - 1986:  N/A
1987  Kefalliniakos
1988 - 1990:  N/A
1991  Evgeros Faraklata
1992  Pankefalliniakos
1993  Lixouri
1994  Pallixouriakos
1995  Kefalliniakos
1996  Asteras Lixouri
1997  Pallixouriakos
1998  Evgeros Faraklata
1999  Pallixouriakos
2000  A.O.K.I.
2001  Pallixouriakos
2002: N/A
2003  Livatho
2004  Pallixouriakos
2005  Anogi
2006  Olympiakos Argostoli
2007  Livatho
2008  Papyrgiakos
2009  Livatho 
2010 Olympiakos Argostoli
2011 AO Eikosimia

Cup Kefalonia-Ithaca

1981 Proodos Ithaca
1982 - 1990:  N/A
1991 Pallixouriakos
1992:  N/A
1993 Kefalliniakos
1994 Kefalliniakos
1995 Evgeros Faraklata
1996 Evgeros Faraklata
1997 Asteras Lixouri
1998 Pallixouriakos
1999 A.O.K.I.
2000 A.O.K.I.
2001 Pallixouriakos
2002 Pankefalliniakos
2003 N/A
2004 Livatho
2005 A.O.K.I.
2006 Livatho
2007 Livatho
2008 Livatho
2009 Livatho
2010 Olympiakos Argostoli
2011 Olympiakos Argostoli

References

 Official website
 rssf

Football
Football
Association football governing bodies in Greece